Italy competed at the 2018 Winter Olympics in Pyeongchang, South Korea, from 9 to 25 February 2018, with 120 competitors in 14 sports. They won ten medals in total, three gold, two silver and five bronze, ranking 12th in the medal table. Short-track speed skater Arianna Fontana, who was also the flag bearer at the opening ceremony, was the country's most successful athlete, having won three medals, one of each color.

Medalists

Competitors
The following is the list of number of competitors participating at the Games per sport/discipline.

Alpine skiing 

Men

Women

Mixed

Biathlon 

Based on their Nations Cup rankings in the 2016–17 Biathlon World Cup, Italy has qualified a team of 5 men and 6 women.

Men

Women

Mixed

Bobsleigh 

Based on their rankings in the 2017–18 Bobsleigh World Cup, Italy has qualified 1 sled.

* – Denotes the driver of each sled

Cross-country skiing 

Italy has qualified 15 athletes, 8 men and 7 women.

Distance
Men

Women

Sprint
Men

Women

Curling  

Italy qualified a men's team by qualifying via the qualification event in Plzeň, Czech Republic.

Summary

Men's tournament

Round-robin
Italy has a bye in draws 5, 7 and 12.

Draw 1
Wednesday, 14 February, 09:05

Draw 2
Wednesday, 14 February, 20:05

Draw 3
Thursday, 15 February, 14:05

Draw 4
Friday, 16 February, 09:05

Draw 6
Saturday, 17 February, 14:05

Draw 8
Sunday, 18 February, 20:05

Draw 9
Monday, 19 February, 14:05

Draw 10
Tuesday, 20 February, 09:05

Draw 11
Tuesday, 20 February, 20:05

Figure skating 

Team event

Freestyle skiing 

Ski cross

Qualification legend: FA – Qualify to medal round; FB – Qualify to consolation round

Luge 

Based on the results from the World Cups during the 2017–18 Luge World Cup season, Italy qualified 7 sleds. 

Men

Women

Mixed team relay

Nordic combined 

Italy has qualified 4 athletes.

Short track speed skating

According to the ISU Special Olympic Qualification Rankings, Italy has qualified 2 men and 5 women.

Men

Women

Qualification legend: ADV – Advanced due to being impeded by another skater; FA – Qualify to medal round; FB – Qualify to consolation round; AA – Advance to medal round due to being impeded by another skater

Skeleton 

Based on the world rankings, Italy qualified 1 sled.

Ski jumping 

Italy has qualified 8 athletes, 4 men and 4 women.

Men

Women

Snowboarding 

Freestyle

Parallel

Snowboard cross

Qualification legend: FA – Qualify to medal round; FB – Qualify to consolation round

Speed skating

Men

Women

Mass start

Team pursuit

See also
Italy national alpine ski team

References

Nations at the 2018 Winter Olympics
2018
Winter Olympics